"Jack and the Beanstalk" is an English fairy tale.

Jack and the Beanstalk may also refer to:

Film
 Jack and the Beanstalk (1902 film), an American short film directed by George S. Fleming and Edwin S. Porter
 Jack and the Beanstalk (1917 film), an American fantasy film directed by Chester M. Franklin and Sidney Franklin
 Jack and the Beanstalk (1924 film) written and directed by Alfred J. Goulding
 Jack and the Beanstalk (1931 film), a Betty Boop cartoon
 Jack and the Beanstalk (1952 film), an American comedy film starring  Abbott and Costello
Jack and the Beanstalk (1967 film), a live-action/animated-hybrid musical-themed film 
 Jack and the Beanstalk (1974 film), a Japanese anime film
 Jack and the Beanstalk (2009 film), an American family film
 Jack the Giant Slayer, a 2013 American fantasy film which draws on the "Jack" fairy tales

Series
 Jack and the Beanstalk: The Real Story, a 2001 American television miniseries
 "Jack and the Beanstalk", a 2007 episode of Super Why! (S01E04)
 "The Warners and the Beanstalk", a 1994 episode in Animaniacs (S01E51) which spoofs the fairy tale
 "Pups and the Beanstalk", a 2014 episode of PAW Patrol (S01E23a) which spoofs the fairy tale

Music
 "Jack and the Beanstalk", a rap song from the album Bastard by Tyler, the Creator
 "Jack and the Beanstalk", a composition for eight instruments and a narrator by Janika Vandervelde

Video games
 Jack and the Beanstalk, a cancelled video game that was turned into Pokémon Snap

See also
 Jack-Wabbit and the Beanstalk
 Beanstalk Bunny
 Beanstalk (disambiguation)
 Jack the Giant Killer (disambiguation)